Solriamfetol, sold under the brand name Sunosi, is a wakefulness-promoting medication used in the treatment of excessive sleepiness related to narcolepsy and sleep apnea. It is taken by mouth.

Common side effects of solriamfetol include headache, nausea, anxiety, and trouble sleeping. It is a norepinephrine–dopamine reuptake inhibitor (NDRI) and is thought to work by increasing levels of the neurotransmitters norepinephrine and dopamine in the brain.

The drug was discovered by a subsidiary of SK Group, which licensed rights outside of eleven countries in Asia to Aerial Pharma in 2011.

Medical uses
Solriamfetol is used to promote wakefulness in the treatment of excessive daytime sleepiness associated with narcolepsy or obstructive sleep apnea in adults.

Available forms
Solriamfetol is available in the form of 75 and 150mg oral tablets.

Side effects
Side effects of solriamfetol include headache, nausea, decreased appetite, insomnia, anxiety, irritability, feeling jittery, dizziness, chest discomfort, heart palpitations, dry mouth, increased sweating, abdominal pain, constipation, and diarrhea.

Solriamfetol at higher-than-approved doses (300, 600, and 1,200mg—two to four times the maximum recommended dose) produces drug-liking responses, including elevated mood and feelings of relaxation, similar in degree to those of phentermine. Elevated mood occurred in 2.4% with placebo, 8 to 24% with solriamfetol, and 10 to 18% with phentermine, while feelings of relaxation occurred in 5% with placebo, 5 to 19% with solriamfetol, and 15 to 20% with phentermine. As such, solriamfetol has significant misuse potential and is a controlled substance in the United States.

Pharmacology

Pharmacodynamics
Solriamfetol is a norepinephrine–dopamine reuptake inhibitor (NDRI). It binds to the dopamine transporter and the norepinephrine transporter with affinities (Ki) of 14.2 μM and 3.7 μM, respectively. It inhibits the reuptake of dopamine and norepinephrine with IC50 values of 2.9 μM and 4.4 μM, respectively. It has weak affinity for the serotonin transporter (Ki = 81.5 μM) and does not appreciably inhibit serotonin reuptake (IC50 > 100 μM). Solriamfetol has no appreciable affinity for a variety of other targets, including the dopamine, serotonin, adrenergic, GABA, adenosine, histamine, orexin, benzodiazepine, and acetylcholine receptors.

Pharmacokinetics
The time to peak levels of solriamfetol is about 2hours (range 1.25–3.0hours). Solriamfetol is minimally metabolized in humans. Its elimination half-life is about 7.1hours.

Chemistry
Solriamfetol is derived from d-phenylalanine and its chemical name is (R)-2-amino-3-phenylpropylcarbamate.

History
The drug was discovered by a subsidiary of SK Group, which licensed rights outside of eleven countries in Asia to Aerial Pharma in 2011. Aerial ran two Phase II trials of the drug in narcolepsy before selling the license to solriamfetol to Jazz in 2014; Jazz Pharmaceuticals paid Aerial $125 million up front and will pay Aerial and SK up to $272 million in milestone payments, and will pay double-digit royalties to SK.

In 2019, solriamfetol was approved in the United States to improve wakefulness in adults with narcolepsy or obstructive sleep apnea (OSA). It was granted orphan drug designation.

The U.S. Food and Drug Administration (FDA) approved solriamfetol based primarily on evidence from five clinical trials (Trial 1/NCT02348593, Trial 2/NCT02348606, Trial 3/NCT02348619, Trial 4/NCT02348632, Trial 5 NCT01681121) of 622 patients with narcolepsy or obstructive sleep apnea (OSA). The trials were conducted in Canada, Europe, and the United States.

Solriamfetol was approved for medical use in the European Union in January 2020.

In March 2022, it was announced that Axsome Therapeutics would be acquiring Solriamfetol, under the brand name Sunosi, from Jazz Pharmaceuticals, for an upfront sum of $53 million. Jazz will receive a high single-digit royalty on Axsome's U.S. net sales of Sunosi in the current indication, and a mid-single-digit royalty in the future indications. Axsome will also assume the commitments of Jazz to SK Biopharmaceuticals and Aerial Biopharma.

Society and culture

Names
During development it has been called SKL-N05, ADX-N05, ARL-N05, and JZP-110.

Legal status
In the United States, solriamfetol is a Schedule IV controlled substance, meaning that it has an accepted medical use and a low potential for abuse, but that abuse may lead to physical or psychological dependence. A prescription is required, and can only be refilled up to five times in a six-month period.  In countries of the European Union, a prescription is required.

Research

Attention deficit hyperactivity disorder
A case report of solriamfetol for the treatment of attention deficit hyperactivity disorder (ADHD) exists.

References

External links
 
 

Carbamates
Norepinephrine–dopamine reuptake inhibitors
Orphan drugs
Phenethylamines
Stimulants